The SS Ulysses (Panama Collier No. 1) was the first of two steel-hulled, twin screw colliers  constructed at Sparrows Point, Maryland by the Maryland Steel Company for the Panama Canal Company. Unlike the Navy ships and many colliers the ships had ten cargo handling king posts rather than the tall, specialized coaling booms as the ships were designed to transport coal to the Panama Canal and be unloaded by equipment there.

Construction
The keel was laid 19 May 1914 as hull number 144 with launch on 12 December 1914 and trials 14–15 April 1915. On 17 April 1915 was delivered at the Norfolk Navy Yard to the Panama Canal Company.

On trials Ulysses averaged  on the standardization course. Two 25 kilowatt generators provided electrical power and a two-ton refrigeration unit was installed for ship's stores. Accommodation was designed for 32 officers and 146 men.

The ship was designed to transport coal to the Panama Canal and then be unloaded by equipment there and thus did not have the coaling booms so characteristic of colliers designed for direct ship to ship coaling operations. Acceptance test for the unloader towers in Panama took place on 28 February 1916 first using Ulysses and then Achilles. Problems with the unloading towers were revealed during that test that delayed acceptance. Four cargo holds for coal and two oil holds forward were covered by hatches designed to hinge upward and served by ten king posts for raising and lowering the covers.

Operation
Ulysses shuttled between Hampton Roads and the Panama Canal Zone, carrying coal to Cristobal, into 1917. During World War I the ship received a main battery of one 5-inch gun and a 3-inch gun and a Navy armed guard crew to man them while the ship continued to discharge her longstanding duties. The guns were apparently removed shortly after the Armistice ended hostilities. Throughout the War, Ulysses belonged to the Panama Canal Company and operated under the control of the Panama Railroad. She continued in this status after peace returned until 1929. In 1929 she was sold and converted to a tanker for American Tankers Corp, her Gross register tonnage decreased to 10,804. In 1937 she was converted to a Whale oil factory ship for the Western Operating Corp and her gross register tonnage was assessed at 12,056. Finally in 1942 she was sold to the Argentinian company Yacimientos Petroliferos Fiscales and renamed San Blas being converted back to a tanker. On 27 April 1944 she suffered an explosion and fire at Central Dock, La Plata.

Footnotes

References

External links
 Photo, off starboard bow
 Outboard profile & plan

See also
 USS Ulysses (ARB-9)

1914 ships
Colliers
Panama Canal
Ships built in Sparrows Point, Maryland